Waldo Ballivián Municipality is the sixth municipal section of the Pacajes Province in the  La Paz Department, Bolivia. Its seat is Tumarapi (or Waldo Ballivián).

See also 
 Ch'alla Jawira
 Janq'u Apachita
 Wila Qullu

References 
 www.ine.gov.bo / census 2001: Waldo Ballivián Municipality

External links 
 Map of the Pacajes Province

Municipalities of La Paz Department (Bolivia)